Hebilli Castle is a ruined castle in Mersin Province, Turkey.

Location

History
The castle was built by an Arabic commander named Kalah Habellieh in the 7th century. The name of the castle, as well as the village, refers to its commissioner.

The building
The two-storey castle is a small castle with outer dimensions . It was probably an observation castle. The outer walls were made of face stone while the inner walls were of rubble stone.

References

Castles in Mersin Province
Archaeological sites in Mersin Province, Turkey
Ruined castles in Turkey
Akdeniz District